Equality Act may refer to:

 Equality Act 2006, an Act of Parliament of the United Kingdom, a precursor to the Equality Act 2010
 Equality Act 2010, an Act of Parliament of the United Kingdom, with the same goals as the four major EU Equal Treatment Directives
 Equality Act (United States), a bill in the United States Congress that would ban discrimination on the basis of sexual orientation and gender identity
 Promotion of Equality and Prevention of Unfair Discrimination Act, 2000, commonly referred to as the Equality Act, an Act of Parliament of South Africa

See also
 Race Relations Act (disambiguation), predecessor Acts of the Parliament of the United Kingdom